Calamotropha boninellus is a moth in the family Crambidae. It was described by Jinshichi Shibuya in 1929. It is found in Japan, where it is found on the Bonin Islands.

References

Crambinae
Moths described in 1929